Greatest Hits is a compilation album by Canadian rock band April Wine released in 1979. The picture on this album cover is also used on three other albums First Glance (1978) (American version only), The Hits (1987), and Classic Masters (2002).

Track listing
All tracks written by Myles Goodwyn unless otherwise noted.
 "Fast Train" – 2:39
 "Drop Your Guns" (D. Henman) – 3:31
 "Weeping Widow" (Robert Wright, AKA. Art La King) – 3:53
 "Rock 'n' Roll Is a Vicious Game" – 3:22
 "Oowatanite" (J. Clench) – 3:35
 "You Could Have Been a Lady" (Errol Brown, Tony Wilson) – 3:20
 "Roller" – 3:34
 "Like a Lover, Like a Song" – 3:46
 "I'm on Fire for You Baby" (Live) (David Elliott) – 3:29
 "Lady Run, Lady Hide" (J. Clench, M. Goodwyn) – 2:57
 "Bad Side of the Moon" (Elton John, Bernie Taupin) – 3:12
 "I Wouldn't Want to Lose Your Love" – 3:07
 "You Won't Dance with Me" – 3:42
 "Tonite Is a Wonderful Time to Fall in Love" – 3:18

Personnel
 Myles Goodwyn – lead & background vocals, guitar, keyboards
 Jim Henman – vocals, bass, acoustic guitar
 Jim Clench – vocals, bass
 Steve Lang – bass, background vocals
 David Henman – vocals, guitar
 Gary Moffet – guitar, background vocals
 Brian Greenway – vocals, guitar, harmonica
 Ritchie Henman – percussion
 Jerry Mercer – drums & percussion, background vocals

Various producers
 Bill Hill – producer
 Ralph Murphy – producer
 Gene Cornish – producer
 Dino Danelli – producer
 Myles Goodwyn – producer
 Doug Morris – producer

References

April Wine albums
1979 greatest hits albums
Albums produced by Myles Goodwyn
Aquarius Records (Canada) compilation albums